Peter Joseph Solomon (born August 16, 1996) is an American professional baseball pitcher in the Arizona Diamondbacks organization. He played college baseball at the University of Notre Dame. He made his MLB debut in 2021 with the Houston Astros.

Career

Amateur career
Solomon attended Mount Saint Joseph High School in Baltimore, Maryland. He was drafted by the San Diego Padres in the 21st round of the 2014 MLB draft, but did not sign. He played college baseball at the University of Notre Dame for the Fighting Irish. After his sophomore season of college in 2016, he played collegiate summer baseball for the Harwich Mariners of the Cape Cod Baseball League, where he was named a league all-star.

Professional career

Houston Astros
Solomon was drafted by the Houston Astros in the fourth round of the 2017 MLB draft and signed. He appeared in one game for the Gulf Coast League Astros in 2017. He split the 2018 season between the Quad Cities River Bandits and the Buies Creek Astros, going a combined 9–1 with a 2.32 ERA and 114 strikeouts over  innings. Solomon appeared in two games for the Fayetteville Woodpeckers in 2019, before undergoing Tommy John Surgery and missing the remainder of that season.

Solomon did not play a minor league game in 2020 due to the cancellation of the minor league season caused by the COVID-19 pandemic. The Astros added Solomon to their 40-man roster after the 2020 season. On April 17, 2021, Solomon was promoted to the major leagues for the first time. He made his MLB debut the next day, pitching a scoreless inning of relief against the Seattle Mariners.  Solomon picked up his first win on September 19, 2021, after working four innings in relief against the Arizona Diamondbacks, a game in which the Astros won 7–6. 

On October 5, 2021 Minor League Baseball announced that Sugar Land Skeeters right-hander Peter Solomon was named the Triple A West Pitcher of the Year.  

On September 1, 2022, the Astros designated Solomon for assignment.

Pittsburgh Pirates
On September 4, Solomon was claimed off waivers by the Pittsburgh Pirates and optioned to Triple A.

Arizona Diamondbacks
On December 7, 2022, he was claimed by the Arizona Diamondbacks in the minor league phase of the Rule 5 draft.

References

External links

Notre Dame Fighting Irish bio

1996 births
Living people
Baseball players from Washington, D.C.
Major League Baseball pitchers
Houston Astros players
Notre Dame Fighting Irish baseball players
Harwich Mariners players
Gulf Coast Nationals players
Fayetteville Woodpeckers players
Quad Cities River Bandits players
Buies Creek Astros players
Sugar Land Skeeters players
Sugar Land Space Cowboys players
Indianapolis Indians players